Nikapitiye Bandara was the king of Sitawaka in 1593. After the death of King Rajasuriya, Veediya Bandara's queen Samudra devi, gave the kingship to her son Nikapitaye Bandara. Arittakivendu was also appointed as general of this king. However, Nikapitiye soon fled in fear of his general Arittakevendu, who had brought a Portuguese army against him out of state greed.

Although Nikapitiya Bandara took an army from Anuradhapura and fought against the Portuguese, he was unable to capture the kingdom. It is said that after him the area of Sitawaka came under control of the Portuguese Empire.

References

Crisis of the Sixteenth Century
Transitional period of Sri Lanka
Kingdom of Sitawaka
Portuguese Ceylon